= Hadrodactylus =

Scientific classification
- Domain: Eukaryota
- Kingdom: Animalia
- Phylum: Arthropoda
- Class: Insecta
- Order: Hymenoptera
- Family: Ichneumonidae
- Genus: Hadrodactylus; Förster, 1869

Genus of wasps

Hadrodactylus is a genus of parasitoid wasps belonging to the family Ichneumonidae.

The species of this genus are found in Europe, Africa and Northern America.

Species:

- Hadrodactylus bidentulus Thomson, 1883
- Hadrodactylus coxatus Davis, 1897
